Scott A. Bailey (born May 2, 1972) is a Canadian former professional ice hockey goaltender who played 19 games in the National Hockey League for the Boston Bruins between 1995 and 1997. Bailey was drafted 112th overall by the Bruins in the 1992 NHL Entry Draft and spent most of his career in the American Hockey League with the Providence Bruins.

Playing career
Bailey played major junior with the Moose Jaw Warriors and Spokane Chiefs of the Western Hockey League. He was selected 112th overall in the 1992 NHL Entry Draft by the Boston Bruins. Bailey played several years with the Bruins minor league affiliates in the American Hockey League and ECHL, and made his NHL debut on November 16, 1995 against the New Jersey Devils. He played 11 games for the Bruins during the 1995–96 season, and a further 8 games in the 1996–97 season. The rest of his career, which lasted until 2004, was spent in various minor leagues, including one season with Tappara in the Finnish SM-liiga.

Post-playing career
Bailey has since ended his hockey career and has attended Taylor University College in Edmonton, Alberta, Canada earning a degree in Religion and Theology with a minor in Biblical Languages and is currently working for the Canada Research Chair in Dead Sea Scrolls Studies while working on his thesis for the MA in Biblical Studies at Trinity Western University.

Career statistics

Regular season and playoffs

Awards
 WHL West Second All-Star Team – 1991 & 1992

External links
 
Scott Bailey's blog

1972 births
Living people
Anchorage Aces players
Birmingham Bulls (ECHL) players
Boston Bruins draft picks
Boston Bruins players
Canadian expatriate ice hockey players in Finland
Canadian expatriate ice hockey players in the United States
Canadian ice hockey goaltenders
Charlotte Checkers (1993–2010) players
Johnstown Chiefs players
Lakeland Loggerheads players
London Knights (UK)
Moose Jaw Warriors players
Orlando Solar Bears (IHL) players
Providence Bruins players
Saint John Flames players
San Antonio Dragons players
Spokane Chiefs players
Ice hockey people from Calgary
Tappara players